Now Hear Our Meanin is an album by the Kenny Clarke/Francy Boland Big Band featuring performances recorded in Germany in 1963 and released on the Columbia label in 1965.

Reception

The AllMusic review stated "Their third studio date is a swinging affair, with potent charts by Boland and a number of strong soloists... The only disappointment with this disc is the excessive use of reverb and occasional shifting of instruments back and forth between both channels".

Track listing
All compositions by Francy Boland, except where indicated.
 "Johnny One Note" (Richard Rodgers, Lorenz Hart) - 2:25
 "Night Lady" - 8:12
 "I'm So Scared of Girls When They're Good Looking" (Jack Sels) - 5:25
 "A Ball for Othello" - 2:32
 "Sabbath Message" - 5:27
 "Now Hear My Meanin'" - 6:29

Personnel 
Kenny Clarke - drums
Francy Boland - piano, arranger
Edmund Arnie, Benny Bailey, Jimmy Deuchar, Maffy Falay, Roger Guérin, Idrees Sulieman - trumpet
Keg Johnson, Erich Kleinschuster, Nat Peck, Åke Persson - trombone
Derek Humble - alto saxophone 
Carl Drevo, Billy Mitchell, Ronnie Scott - tenor saxophone 
Sahib Shihab - baritone saxophone, flute
Jimmy Woode - bass
Joe Harris - timpani

References 

1965 albums
Kenny Clarke/Francy Boland Big Band albums
Columbia Records albums